A funitel is a type of cableway, generally used to transport skiers, although at least one is used to transport finished cars between different areas of a factory.  It differs from a standard gondola lift through the use of two arms attached to two parallel overhead cables, providing more stability in high winds. The name funitel is a portmanteau of the French words funiculaire and telepherique.  

When used to transport skiers, funitels are a fast way to get to a higher altitude. Skis or snowboard have to be taken off and held during the trip. Depending on the configuration, cabins may or may not contain seats. Without seats, funitels can sometimes be uncomfortable for long trips, in the same way other large cable cars can be. Funitels combine a short time between successive cabins with a capacity of around 20 to 30 people per cabin.

Overview

A funitel installation employs two cables (or a single cable arranged in two loops) strung between two terminals and supported by intermediate towers. During transit from terminal to terminal each of a series of detachable passenger cabins is suspended from the two cables which move in parallel at exactly the same rate. The technology was developed from the Double Monocable Creissels (DMC) lift, which featured two so-called monocables (supplying both support and propulsion) moving in parallel and spaced about one meter apart. This technology was developed by the French engineering company Denis Creissels SA and was manufactured by Poma in the 1980s. In the 1990s the first funitels were built, differing from earlier DMC lifts by having the two cables spaced far enough apart for the cabin to be hung between the cables, instead of underneath, thus eliminating the need for a long hanger arm which makes the carrier assembly susceptible to swinging in strong winds. The two cables in these early funitel installations have separate tensioning systems and separate, electrically synchronized motors, one for each cable. Later the double-loop monocable (DLM) was developed, featuring a single cable looped around twice, as the diagram below shows. DLM ensures that the cable sections from which a cabin is suspended move at the same speed without motor synchronization.

The first funitel was constructed in Val-Thorens, 1990, by Denis Creissels SA and Enterprises Reel and Städeli-Lift. The first funitel-style lift constructed outside Europe was near Mammoth Mountain, California at June Mountain ski area, built by Yan Lift in 1988. Jan Kunczynski, the owner of Yan, actually claimed to have invented the funitel lift with reference to US Patent 4,848,241. The Yan "QMC" differed, however, from other funitels in having a quad-monocable design with vertically aligned drive sheaves. The QMC suffered from various design flaws including the famously unsafe Yan cable grips and was shut down by California safety inspectors in 1996 and dismantled over the course of the next few years.

Funitel passenger cabins are connected to the overhead cable sections with four spring-loaded grips — two for each cable section. As with other detachable-carrier lifts the cabins are decelerated and detached from the cables at the terminal for boarding, then accelerated and reattached for transit to the other terminal.

Reversible funitel
In 1985 Poma produced a reversible funitel in Megève, France. This system was originally referred to as a DMC lift, although it uses the configuration which would later become known as DLM. Unlike a modern funitel, the cable on this system does not move uninterruptedly. Instead, the system operates in a similar manner to an aerial tramway, with two large cabins shuttling back-and-forth. These cabins do not detach from the cable in normal operation. A similar system was built in 1993, in Montmorency Falls Park, Canada, by the French and Canadian subsidiaries of Doppelmayr.

In 2002, Poma installed a reversible funitel in Val Thorens, France. Instead of two large cabins, this system features two groups of three smaller cabins shuttling back-and-forth. A similar system was built by Doppelmayr in 2004, in Alpe d'Huez, France. Another similar system in Val Thorens was built by the Swiss manufacturer, Bartholet, in 2011.

List of funitels

Andorra
Encamp sector, Grandvalira ski resort

Austria
St. Anton am Arlberg
Ischgl
Kitzsteinhorn (Kaprun)
Hintertux

Canada
Montmorency Falls, Quebec City

France
Val-Thorens
La Plagne: Built by Doppelmayr it runs from Plagne Centre (1970m) up to La Grande Rochette (2505m).
L'Alpe d'Huez
Super Besse
Les Deux Alpes

Greece
Athens: Parnitha Funitel

Japan
Hashikurasan Ropeway, Miyoshi, Tokushima
Hakone Ropeway, Hakone, Kanagawa
Tanigawadake Ropeway, Tanigawadake Tenjindaira Ski Resort, Minakami, Gunma
Zaō Ropeway, Yamagata Zaō Onsen Ski Resort, Yamagata, Yamagata

Slovakia
Bratislava – used to transport cars in Volkswagen factory
Jasná - ski resort

Switzerland
Verbier
Crans-Montana

United States
Palisades Tahoe

See also
List of aerial lift manufacturers
Lift Engineering (built the QMC funitel - a funitel that actually had four cables)

References

External links

Doppelmayr funitel Page
Poma funitel page

Aerial lifts
Ski lift types